Thomas Ongodia Aisu (January 1, 1954 — October 16, 2018), was a Ugandan medical doctor, microbiologist, academic and academic administrator, who at the time of his death, served as an associate professor at the Soroti University School of Health Sciences.

Background and education
Thomas was born in Otipe Village, Olungia Ward, in the Southern Division of Kumi Municipality. After attending local schools, he studied at Namilyango College, an all-boys boarding high school in Mukono District, where he completed his A-Level studies.

In 1974 he was admitted to Makerere University School of Medicine, graduating in 1979 with a Bachelor of Medicine and Bachelor of Surgery degree. Later, in 1988, the same medical school awarded him the Master of Medicine degree in Pathology, specializing in Microbiology.

Career
Aisu worked in the past as a Laboratory Specialist Medical Officer at the World Health Organization. During the 1990s and early 2000s, he served as the Head of the Department of Medical Microbiology at Makerere University Medical School in Uganda. He also served as the Head of the National Tuberculosis Reference Laboratory.

In 2018, he served as a consultant pathologist at Mulago National Referral Hospital in Kampala, from where he was recruited to serve as an associate professor at Soroti University.

Death
On the morning of Tuesday 16 October 2018, Aisu drove himself in his personal automobile to the campus of Soroti University. He had gone to attend a meeting of the University Senate, which was in preparation for a visit from the Uganda National Council for Higher Education the following week. Aisu made a presentation to the meeting which took place in the university boardroom.

After his presentation, the professor collapsed and died. His body was taken, first to Soroti Regional Referral Hospital, but was later forwarded to Mulago Hospital for a postmortem. He was laid to rest at his ancestral home, in Kumi Municipality, on Saturday 20 October 2018.

See also
 Robert Ikoja-Odongo
 Specioza Kazibwe
 Magid Kagimu
 Kenneth Ocen Obwot
 Churchill Lukwiya Onen

References

External links
Website of Soroti University

1954 births
2018 deaths
Ugandan microbiologists
Itesot people
20th-century Ugandan physicians
Makerere University alumni
Academic staff of Makerere University
Academic staff of Soroti University
People from Kumi District
People educated at Namilyango College
21st-century Ugandan physicians